Graham Gilding Davies (3 October 1921 – 2003) was a Welsh footballer who played in the Football League as a goalkeeper for Colchester United.

Career

Davies, born in Swansea, played for Swansea Town as a youth but failed to make a first-team appearance for the club. He moved to Football League club Watford in 1947 where he made nine appearances. He joined Southern League side Colchester United in 1949, making two league appearances. Davies made his debut for Colchester on 28 April 1949 in a 3–0 win over Worcester City and his final appearance came just two matches later in the Southern League Cup final which resulted in a 3–0 defeat for the U's versus Yeovil Town. Davies would later play for Hereford United and returned to Wales to play for Merthyr Tydfil. He died in 2003.

Honours
Colchester United
1948–49 Southern League Cup runner-up

All honours referenced by:

References

1921 births
2003 deaths
Footballers from Swansea
Welsh footballers
Association football goalkeepers
Swansea City A.F.C. players
Watford F.C. players
Colchester United F.C. players
Hereford United F.C. players
Merthyr Tydfil F.C. players
English Football League players
Southern Football League players